The 32nd Intelligence Battalion is the premier reconnaissance and intelligence gathering unit of the Swedish Army. The battalion possesses units and material to conduct long range reconnaissance, sabotage and control indirect fire as well as close air support (CAS). It also has the main responsibility for all drone operations in the Swedish military. It is organized under the Life Regiment Hussars (K 3) in Karlsborg.

Tasks and operations 
The 32nd Intelligence Battalion is tasked with various reconnaissance and intelligence gathering operations. The majority of this being carried out by the Ranger squadrons, who operate with 8 man patrols over long ranges deep behind enemy lines in order to conduct reconnaissance or sabotage vital enemy support functions/infrastructure. In addition to that, the battalion has unmanned aerial vehicles, both smaller SUAV systems at the Ranger squadrons as well as larger, more advanced TUAV systems.

The battalion has deployed to Kosovo, Afghanistan and Mali, conducting the full spectrum of its wartime tasks.

Organization 
The battalion in its current form comprises: 

- Staff & support squadron

- Two reconnaissance squadrons 

- Parachute Ranger squadron

The staff and support squadron provides command and logistic support, along with housing several specialist functions such as a HUMINT platoon and the battalions TUAV's. The reconnaissance squadrons along with the parachute rangers are made up of 3–4 platoons with 8-man patrols along with specialist functions such as snipers, TACP and SUAV teams.

Similar units 
  – 1st Intelligence, Surveillance and Reconnaissance Brigade
  – 13th Parachute Dragoon Regiment
  – Fernspählehrkompanie 200
  – Etterretningsbataljonen
  – Laskuvarjojääkärit

References

External links 
 

Battalions of the Swedish Army
Karlsborg Garrison